Tovkhosh Mountains (in some sources Tobhata Mountains) is an area of mountains in Mongolia, on the south western shore of Khar lake in the Zavkhan Aimag.

Tobhata Uul is another name for the mountain. It is located in Dzabkhan, Mongolia.

Annotated view

References 

Mountains of Mongolia